The Norwegian Futsal Premier League is the top division for men's futsal in Norway. Its official Norwegian name is NFF Eliteserien Futsal.

Format

Competition
There are 10 clubs in the Norwegian Futsal Premier League. During the course of a season, each club plays the others twice, for a total of 18 games for each club, and a total of 90 games in a season. The season starts in late-October and lasts until mid-March. Matches are mostly played over a number weekends during the winter months with a short break during the Christmas holiday and New Year.

Teams receive three points for a win and one point for a draw. No points are awarded for a loss. Teams are ranked by total points, then goal difference, goals scored, and then head-to-head records used to separate teams on equal points. At the end of each season, the club with the most points is crowned "Champions". The two lowest placed teams are automatically relegated to the First Division and will be replaced by two teams from a  playoff tournament in the First Division.

European qualification
The winners of the Norwegian Futsal Premier League qualifies for the UEFA Futsal Champions League preliminary round.

Members for 2022–23
The following 10 clubs are competing in the Norwegian Futsal Premier League during the 2022-23 season:

References

External links
Futsal in the Norwegian Football Association

Futsal competitions in Norway
futsal
Norway
2008 establishments in Norway
Sports leagues established in 2008